Mirosław Koźlakiewicz (born 11 June 1957 in Kunki) is a Polish politician. He was elected to the Sejm on 25 September 2005, getting 7,475 votes in 16 Płock district as a candidate from the Civic Platform list.

He was also a member of Sejm 1997-2001.

See also
Members of Polish Sejm 2005-2007

External links
Mirosław Koźlakiewicz - parliamentary page - includes declarations of interest, voting record, and transcripts of speeches.

Members of the Polish Sejm 2005–2007
Members of the Polish Sejm 1997–2001
Civic Platform politicians
1957 births
Living people
Members of the Polish Sejm 2007–2011
Members of the Polish Sejm 2011–2015
Kraków University of Economics alumni